José Salazar (born December 9, 1957) is a retired triple jumper from Venezuela.

Achievements

References
 
 1983 Year Ranking

1957 births
Living people
Venezuelan male triple jumpers
Place of birth missing (living people)
Athletes (track and field) at the 1983 Pan American Games
Pan American Games bronze medalists for Venezuela
Pan American Games medalists in athletics (track and field)
Medalists at the 1983 Pan American Games
20th-century Venezuelan people
21st-century Venezuelan people